The Mecachrome GP2 V8 (also known as Mecachrome V8108) engine is a 4.0-litre, naturally-aspirated, V8 racing engine, developed and produced by Mecachrome for the GP2 Series (2005–2016), and later the FIA Formula 2 Championship (2017). The Mecachrome GP2 V8 was built in late-2002 and later completed and assembled at Mecachrome, power assembly plant in Aubigny-sur-Nère, France in late 2004. The Mecachrome GP2 V8 was the sole engine allowed in the GP2 series at the time.

In 2005-2010 Mecachrome engines were badged as "Renault".

Statistics

Applications
Dallara GP2/05
Dallara GP2/08
Dallara GP2/11

References

External links
Mecachrome official website in French language
Mecachrome official website in English language
FIA Formula 2 official website

Engines by model
Gasoline engines by model
FIA Formula 2 Championship
V8 engines